is a Japanese football player currently playing for JEF United Chiba.

Club statistics
Updated to 15 January 2021.

1Includes Emperor's Cup.
2Includes J. League Cup.
3Includes AFC Champions League.

National team statistics

References

External links
 Profile at Júbilo Iwata
 Profile at Nagoya Grampus
 
 
 
 Japan National Football Team Database

1991 births
Living people
Association football people from Okinawa Prefecture
Japanese footballers
Japan international footballers
J1 League players
J2 League players
Nagoya Grampus players
Júbilo Iwata players
JEF United Chiba players
Association football midfielders